The 2021 FIBA Women's AmeriCup was the 16th edition of the FIBA Women's AmeriCup, which is the main tournament for senior women's basketball national teams of the FIBA Americas. It was held from 11 to 19 June 2021. On 20 March 2021, Puerto Rico was confirmed as the host. The top four teams qualify for one of the qualifying tournaments for the 2022 FIBA Women's Basketball World Cup.

The United States won their fourth title by defeating Puerto Rico in the final, 74–59.

Qualification

Draw
The draw took place on 22 May 2021.

Seeding

Squads

Each team consisted of 12 players.

Preliminary round
All times are local (UTC−4).

Group A

Group B

Knockout stage

Bracket

Quarterfinals

Semifinals

Third place game

Final

Final standing

Statistics and awards

Statistical leaders

Players

Points

Rebounds

Assists

Blocks

Steals

Efficiency

Teams

Points

Rebounds

Assists

Blocks

Steals

Efficiency

Awards
The awards were announced on 20 June 2021.

Notes

References

External links

 
FIBA Women's AmeriCup
2020–21 in South American basketball
2020–21 in North American basketball
2021 in women's basketball
June 2021 sports events in North America
International women's basketball competitions hosted by Puerto Rico